Orzeł Piaski Wielkie (KS Orzeł Piaski Wielkie) is a Polish football club based in Podgórze Duchackie district  of Kraków. They currently play in the IV Liga, the fifth tier of the Polish football league.

History

Season to season

  * : Relegated due to reorganisation of the leagues. From the 2006/2007 season there is one IV liga group in Lesser Poland (replacing the two groups). Teams relegated to the newly formed V liga (two groups).
  ** : Relegated due to reorganisation of the leagues. From the 2011/2012 the V liga is abolished. The IV liga is split to two group in Lesser Poland (expanding the participating number of clubs in IV liga).
Sources: 2001/02 - current season

Squad 

Trener:

Current coaching staff

Sources:

References

External links 
 

Football clubs in Kraków
Football clubs in Poland
Association football clubs established in 1944
1944 establishments in Poland